Thaana is a Unicode block containing characters for the Thaana script used for writing the Dhivehi and Arabic languages in the Maldives.

History
The following Unicode-related documents record the purpose and process of defining specific characters in the Thaana block:

References 

Unicode blocks